The Prime Minister of the Mutawakkilite Kingdom of Yemen was the head of government of that country in what is now northern Yemen. The Prime Minister was appointed by the King. There were seven prime ministers of North Yemen.

Footnotes

See also
Imams of Yemen
List of heads of government of Yemen

External links
World Statesmen - North Yemen

History of Yemen
 
Government of Yemen
Mutawakkilite Kingdom of Yemen Prime Minister of
Yemen politics-related lists
Yemen history-related lists